Johann "Hans" Nelböck (May 12, 1903 – February 3, 1954) was an Austrian former student and murderer of Moritz Schlick, the founder of the group of philosophers and scientists known as the Vienna Circle.

After attending the gymnasium in Wels, Nelböck studied philosophy at the University of Vienna from 1925 on with Moritz Schlick, who was his doctoral advisor, and graduated as a Doctor of Philosophy on March 21, 1931, with the doctoral thesis "The Importance of Logic in Empirism and Positivism". Twice Nelböck was sent to a mental hospital with the diagnosis of schizoid personality disorder. He had threatened to kill Schlick.

On June 22, 1936, Nelböck shot Schlick in the chest, killing him on one of the central staircases of the University of Vienna. The substantiation of the judgment of the Provincial Court for Criminal Matters of Vienna (dated May 26, 1937) summed up: 

The court declared Nelböck to be fully compos mentis, he confessed to the act, was detained without any resistance, but was unrepentant. He used the judicial proceedings as a chance to present himself and his ideology in the public. A significant part of his defence was the claim that Schlick's anti-metaphysical philosophy had undermined his native moral restraints, a line of thought which Austrian Nazis, asserting Schlick's Jewish connections within the Vienna Circle, quickly developed and exploited. In another version of the events Nelböck covered all political causes up and claimed, that he was motivated by jealousy over his failed attachment to the female student Sylvia Borowicka, leading to a paranoid delusion about Schlick as his rival and persecutor.

Nelböck was found guilty and sentenced, but in the event he became a distorted cause célèbre, around which crystallized the growing nationalist and anti-Jewish sentiments in the city. Although a German Protestant from minor Prussian nobility, Schlick was subsequently characterized in the press as a pivotal figure in disaffected Jewish circles, and the murder was applauded by Vienna's austrofascists.

On May 26, 1937, Nelböck was sentenced to ten years' imprisonment, but only two years later - after the annexation of Austria into Nazi Germany in 1938 - asked for a pardon. In his application he pointed out "that by his act and the result elimination of a Jewish teacher who propagated doctrines alien and detrimental to the nation he rendered National Socialism a service and also suffered for National Socialism as a consequence of his act. Since the world-view, the rightness of which he recognized even then and out of which he committed his act, is now the ruling national ideology, he considers it a hardship if he still has to remain in a disadvantaged position because of an act which sprang from his world-view." 
Because the Senior Public Prosecutor concluded that Nelböck's act was accompanied primarily by personal motives, Nelböck was only released on probation on October 11, 1938.

From 1938 on, Nelböck worked in the geological department of the wartime economic oil authority. When the period of probation ended in 1943, he worked as a technical employee in the Main Measurement Office.

In 1951, Nelböck sued Victor Kraft, a member of the Vienna Circle, who had called Nelböck a "paranoid psychopath" in his (Kraft's) book Der Wiener Kreis. Kraft agreed to an out-of-court settlement.

Works
 Die Bedeutung der Logik im Empirismus und Positivismus. Dissertation, Vienna 1930.

References

External links
  Internationale Mathematische Nachrichten, Vienna 2006
  Karl-Peter Schwarz: 'Das Ende des Wiener Kreises: "So Hund, jetzt hast du es"' (Die Presse 2 Nov 1997)
  Christian Köllerer: 'Die Errungenschaften der Postmoderne als Theorie: Eine philosophische Kritik'

1903 births
1954 deaths
Austrian people convicted of murder
People convicted of murder by Austria
People with schizoid personality disorder
University of Vienna alumni
1936 murders in Austria